Komachi may refer to:

 Komachi (train), the name of a Japanese train service
 Komachi (Kanagawa), a neighbourhood in Kamakura, Kanagawa prefecture, Japan
 Komachi, Iran, a village in South Khorasan Province, Iran
 Sekidera Komachi, a Japanese Noh play
 Komachi Onozuka, a Touhou Project character

People 
 Ono no Komachi (825–900), Japanese poet
, Imperial Japanese Navy fighter pilot ace
, Japanese diplomat and former Ambassador to Thailand.
 Komachi is a ring name, used by various professional wrestlers in Japan

Volador Jr., was the first to use the name.
Místico took over the part after Volador (born 1982), Jr.
Mike Segura (born 1969), who sometimes worked as "Komachi II"